RCAF Station Claresholm was a British Commonwealth Air Training Plan station that trained pilots for World War II service. The station was located near Claresholm, Alberta, Canada.

History

World War II
No. 15 Service Flying Training School (SFTS) opened on 9 June 1941, and closed on 30 March 1945.
No. 2 Flying Instructor School (FIS) was established as a sub unit of No. 15 SFTS on 27 April 1942 but relocated in September 1942 to Vulcan. Student pilots at No.2 FIS flew Tiger Moths and Cessna Cranes.

Aerodrome information
Six runways were listed as follows:

Relief landing field – Woodhouse

The primary Relief Landing Field (R1) for RCAF Station Claresholm was located southeast of the community of Claresholm. Three runways were listed as follows:

The site is presently used for agricultural purposes.

Postwar
Claresholm was placed on care and maintenance status until reactivated in 1951 as a NATO training centre run by No. 3 Flying Training School (flying Harvards). The station closed again in 1958 when the school was relocated to Gimli, Manitoba. It is now the Claresholm Industrial Airport. , hangars 2 to 4 are derelict and deteriorating.

References

External links
Bomber Command Museum of Canada
Claresholm Museum

Canadian Forces bases in Canada (closed)
Claresholm
Claresholm
Military airbases in Alberta
Defunct airports in Alberta
Military history of Alberta
1941 establishments in Alberta